The 2002 Raliul Brasovului was the first round of the Romanian Rally Championship. It took place between March 22–24, 2002. The Rally consisted of 12 special stages.

Results

Rally racing series